The Cold River is a  river in the Adirondack Mountains in New York, United States.  It was one of the first rivers in the state designated as a Wild River, in 1972.  The river is located near the conjunction of the county lines of Essex, Franklin and Hamilton Counties (south central Essex, southeastern Franklin, and northeastern Hamilton).

The river ultimately flows into the Raquette River, in a marsh at the north end of Long Lake in the Town of Long Lake.

The area is associated with Noah John Rondeau, a hermit, who lived ten miles up the Cold River for twenty years and termed himself the "Mayor of Cold River City (population 1)".  He was, however, a very sociable hermit.

See also
List of New York rivers

References

External links
 Cold River regional information

Rivers of New York (state)
Rivers of Essex County, New York
Rivers of Franklin County, New York
Rivers of Hamilton County, New York
Tributaries of the Saint Lawrence River